Mum, or Katiati, is a Papuan language of Madang Province, Papua New Guinea.

Phonology

Vowels

References

Sogeram languages
Languages of Madang Province